Jamie McShane is an American actor best known for his roles on Sons of Anarchy, Southland, and Bloodline, and as Agent Jackson in the Marvel Cinematic Universe (MCU) films Thor (2011) and The Avengers (2012). In 2021, he appeared in the crime television series CSI: Vegas. In 2022, he played Det. Lankford in the Netflix series, The Lincoln Lawyer, and Sheriff Galpin in Wednesday.

Early life
Jamie McShane was born and raised in Northern New Jersey with his four siblings. McShane got his BA in English at the University of Richmond in 1988.

Career
McShane has had a long career with many guest and recurring roles on television series such as 24, House, Stalker, Fear the Walking Dead, and The Fosters. His most notable roles are Cameron Hayes in Sons of Anarchy, Sergeant Terry Hill in Southland, and Eric O'Bannon in Bloodline. McShane will also have a recurring role in CSI: Vegas.

McShane's film work includes Gone Girl and Argo.

In October 2016, McShane was given the Maltese Falcon award for his character portrayal of Eric O'Bannon on the TV series Bloodline. The award was given by the Humphrey Bogart Film Festival in Key Largo and presented by Humphrey Bogart's son Stephen.

Filmography

Film

Television

References

External links
 

Living people
Male actors from New Jersey
American male television actors
Year of birth missing (living people)
American male film actors
People from Saddle River, New Jersey
University of Richmond alumni
21st-century American male actors